Qarib  (Arabic and in ) means near or familiar. Gharib (Arabic and ), written differently, means strange or stranger. Although the pronunciation of the two words vary slightly, the difference is often imperceptible. Both are commonly transliterated into English as "gharib".

Gharib may refer to 

Gharib (Hadith terminology), in Arabic غَرِيْب, a hadith conveyed by only one narrator
Gharib (crater), crater near the north pole of Saturn's moon Enceladus
Gharib Church, also known as St. Georg Church, a historical church in Isfahan, Iran

People
Abbas Gharib (born 1942), Italian-based architect of Iranian origin
Amir al-Arabi Ali Gharib, Libyan diplomat 
Burhanuddin Gharib (d. 1344), Indian Sufi belonging to the Chishti Order
Hossein Gharib (born 1940), Iranian medical researcher and author
Jaouad Gharib (born 1972), Moroccan long-distance runner
Mohammad Gharib (1909–1975), Iranian physician, clinician, professor and pioneer of pediatrics in Iran
Roozegar-e Gharib, TV series about Dr. Mohammad Gharib above
Shawky Gharib (born 1959), Egyptian football player 
Susie Gharib (born 1950), American business news journalist and TV anchor
Gharib Amzine (born 1973), retired Moroccan footballer. He played for Mulhouse, Racing Strasbourg and Troyes AC, all in France, usually as a midfielder
Gharib Shah (d. 1629), Iranian aristocrat who rebelled against Safavid rule in 1629/30, but was defeated and later executed
Shapoor Gharib (1933–2012), Iranian director and screenplay writer
Badr al-Zamān Qarīb (23 August 1929 – 28 July 2020), Iranian linguist
Djamchid Gharib (born ~1910), Iranian ambassador to Spain

Places 
Darreh Gharib
Emamzadeh Shah Gharib
Gharib Dust
Gharib Hajji
Gharib Kandi
Gharib Mazraeh
Ras Gharib
Sayed Gharib
 Ahmad Gharib, Kohgiluyeh and Boyer-Ahmad
 Ahmad Gharib, West Azerbaijan
 Gharib Mahalleh, Gilan
 Gharib Mahalleh, Mazandaran
Gharib Mazra'eh
Gharib Nawaz Mosque
 Omm ol Gharib-e Bozorg
 Omm ol Gharib-e Kuchek

See also
Garib (disambiguation)